Musu Point or Musu Dan ("Cape of the Dancing Water" or "Waters") is a North Korean headland in the middle of the country's eastern coast along the Sea of Japan. It forms the eastern side of North Hamgyong's Hwadae County and the northern point of East Korea Bay.

Names
During the Japanese occupation of Korea, it was known as

Geography
Musu Point is a promontory consisting of high reddish cliffs projecting boldly south but tapering down to the sea at its apex, which marks the northern end of East Korea Bay.

Another, considered to resemble two crouching dogs when approached from the north or south, lies just off the coast  to its north.

The area is subject to abnormal magnetic variations.

History
The Japanese passenger ship Koshun Maru, operated by the OSK Line, was wrecked off the point in 1910. Musu Dan Lighthouse, rising from near the cape's south extremity, was first erected the next year. The  white structure is still active, but closed to the public. The American National Geospatial-Intelligence Agency notes, however, that "the existence and operation of all navigational aids should be considered unreliable on the east coast of North Korea".

See also
		
 Musudan, its namesake North Korean missile
 Musudan Village, its namesake village and missile launch site
 List of lighthouses in North Korea

References

Citations

Bibliography
 .
 .
 .
 . 
 .

External links
 , a topographical map of the area around Musu Point.

Headlands of North Korea
Landforms of North Hamgyong
Lighthouses in North Korea